NGC 5965 is a spiral galaxy located in the constellation Draco. It is located at a distance of circa 150 million light years from Earth, which, given its apparent dimensions, means that NGC 5965 is about 260,000 light years across. It was discovered by William Herschel on May 5, 1788. Two supernovae have been observed in NGC 5965, SN 2001 cm (type II, mag 17.5) and SN 2018cyg (type II, mag 17.0).

NGC 5965 is seen nearly edge-on, with an inclination of 80 degrees. Dust is seen across the galactic disk, while there is also a red dust lane at the nucleus. The bulge is X-shaped, that suggests that the galaxy is actually barred. NGC 5965 along with another edge-on galaxy, NGC 5746, were the galaxies used to confirm that peanut shaped bulges are associated with the presence of a bar, by spectrographically observing the disturbance caused at the velocity distributions of the galaxies. 
The galaxy features some level of disk disturbance, like a warp, as the outer part of the disk along with a ring-like dust lane appear to be on a different plane from the bulge, but it could also be a projection effect. When observed in K band, the galaxy features a stellar ring.

NGC 5965 lies in a galaxy filament which also includes NGC 5987 and its loose group, which includes NGC 5981, NGC 5982, NGC 5985, three galaxies known as the Sampler.

Gallery

References

External links 

Spiral galaxies
Draco (constellation)
5965
09914
55459
Astronomical objects discovered in 1788
Discoveries by William Herschel